Ninia hudsoni, the Guyana coffee snake or Hudson's coffee snake, is a species of snake in the family Colubridae.  The species is native to Guyana, Ecuador, Peru, Brazil, and Colombia.

References

Ninia
Snakes of South America
Reptiles of Guyana
Reptiles of Ecuador
Reptiles of Peru
Reptiles of Brazil
Reptiles of Colombia
Reptiles described in 1940
Taxa named by Hampton Wildman Parker